Oyatsupan Bakers, or simply Oyatsupan, is a Japanese bakery in the U.S. state of Oregon. The original bakery opened in Beaverton in 2016, and second location opened in Tigard in 2019.

Description 
Oyatsupan is an "austere" Japanese bakery in Beaverton, according to Portland Monthly. The menu has included "whimsical "chocolate pudding stuffed cornets,  croissant dough apple pies with matcha custard, and doughnuts filled with Japanese beef curry, as well as eclairs, Japanese breads, pastries, and sandwiches. In 2018, Grant Butler of The Oregonian wrote, "This airy, elegant bakery combines Japanese and Western baking traditions, resulting in pastry cases filled with baked goods you expect (croissants, baguettes, puff pastry) with things you don't see at other places (green tea cookies, Japanese sweet buns, buttery rolls filled with edamame or red bean paste). There are savory options, too, like the unusual hot dog roll, which features a wiener baked into a brioche bun, and dressed up with drizzles of ketchup, mayonnaise and mustard."

History 
The bakery opened in May 2016.  Hiro Horie is the chef and owner. In 2019, a second location called Oyatsupan Bridgeport Village opened in Tigard.

Reception 
Samantha Bakall included Oyatsupan in National Geographics list of "six of the best Asian bakeries in Portland".  Lizzy Acker included the bakery in The Oregonian's 2018 list of "81 awesome things to do in Portland's suburbs". In 2019, the newspaper's Michael Russell called Oyatsupan "excellent" and wrote, "Oyatsupan, the very good Japanese bakery in Beaverton, has a few items in common, most notably the milk bread, a thick-sliced loaf of fluffy white bread called Whipped Cream Pan Bread at Tous Les Jours. Grab a loaf and up your PB&J game a level or two."

Jordan Curtis and Brooke Jackson-Glidden included the bakery in Eater Portland's 2020 "Guide to Eating and Drinking in Beaverton, Tigard, and Hillsboro Right Now". In 2022, Karen Brooks and Katherine Chew Hamilton included Oyatsupan in Portland Monthly's "Opinionated Guide to Portland’s Best Bakeries".

See also 

 List of bakeries

References

External links 

 

2016 establishments in Oregon
Bakeries of Oregon
Japanese restaurants in Oregon
Restaurants in Beaverton, Oregon
Tigard, Oregon